Gösta Elof Rune Wenzel (4 January 1901 – 29 July 1977) was a Swedish footballer. He represented GAIS and IFK Göteborg during a career that spanned between 1918 and 1932, winning three Swedish Championships with the former. He played in 30 matches for the Sweden national football team from 1919 to 1930. He was also part of Sweden's squad for the football tournament at the 1920 Summer Olympics, but he did not play in any matches.

Personal life 
Wenzel was the younger brother of Gunnar Wenzel, who was also a footballer for IFK Göteborg.

Career statistics

International 

 Scores and results list Sweden's goal tally first, score column indicates score after each Wenzel goal.

Honours 
GAIS

 Swedish Champion: 1919, 1922, 1930–31
Individual

 Stor Grabb: 1926

References

1901 births
1977 deaths
Swedish footballers
Sweden international footballers
Place of birth missing
Association football midfielders
GAIS players